Nettenchelys exoria is an eel in the family Nettastomatidae (duckbill/witch eels). It was described by James Erwin Böhlke and David G. Smith in 1981. It is a marine, deep water-dwelling eel which is known from the western central Atlantic Ocean, including Florida, USA and the Bahamas.

The species epithet "exoria" is derived from the Greek word "exorios", meaning "beyond the frontier", and refers to the posterior nostrils being located at the back of the head.

References

Nettastomatidae
Fish described in 1981
Taxa named by Eugenia Brandt Böhlke